Dag Vag is a Swedish band formed in 1978. The lead singer was Per Odeltorp (1948–2012), popularly known as Stig Vig. Their early punk sound became, after a while, increasingly more reggae-like. The band referred to it as "transcontinental rock-reggae". Their popularity peaked in the 1980s, but they are still active.

Dag Vag sometimes toured with Swedish punk band Ebba Grön and made a cameo in their documentary film Ebba the Movie.

Members

Current line up
 Tage Dirty - drums (1978–present)
 Zilverzurfarn - guitar, vocals (1978-2007, 2010–present)
 Teka Pukk - guitar (2008–present)

Former members
 Stig Vig - bass, vocals (1978-2012)
 Bumpaberra - keyboards  (1978, 1981-1983, 1988-1990, 1999-2001)
 Beno Zeno - guitar (1979-1981, 1988-1992, 1999-2001, 2004-2010)
 Per Cussion - percussion, keyboards (1981-1983)
 Kopp Te - saxophones, flute (1981-1983, 1989-1992, 1999)
 Olsson - guitar (1978-1979)

Discography

Studio albums
1979 - Dag Vag
1979 - Scenbuddism (Live)
1980 - Palsternacka
1982 - 7 lyckliga elefanter
1983 - Almanacka
1989 - Helq
1992 - Halleluja!
2006 - Kackerlacka
2007 - Klassiker
2012 - Nattmacka

Singles
1978 - Dimma (under the name Dag Vag & Svagsinta)
1978 - Flyger
1980 - Hellre en raket
1981 - Blöt dröm
1981 - Popitop
1983 - Samma sång
1989 - Du får aldrig nog
1989 - Tiden går
1990 - En gång till!
1991 - Nya skor
1992 - Hämta mej
1992 - Fyrverkeri
2006 - En del av dej

EP
2011 - epette

References

External links
www.dagvag.se - Official web page

Swedish musical groups
Reggae rock groups
Musical groups established in 1978